is a Japanese football player. She plays for Albirex Niigata and Japan national team.

Club career
Hirao was born in Matsudo on December 31, 1996. She joined L.League club Urawa Reds from JFA Academy Fukushima in 2014. She played many matches as regular goalkeeper and the club won the champions in first season. However her opportunity to play decreased behind Sakiko Ikeda from 2015 season. In 2018, she moved to Albirex Niigata.

National team career
In September 2012, when Hirao was 15 years old, she was selected Japan U-17 national team for 2012 U-17 Women's World Cup and she played 3 matches as regular goalkeeper. In November 2016, she was selected Japan U-20 national team for 2016 U-20 Women's World Cup. She played 5 matches and Japan won the 3rd place.

In April 2018, Hirao was selected Japan national team for 2018 Women's Asian Cup. Although she did not play in any matches, Japan won the championship after two tournaments in a row. On August 2, she debuted against Australia.

National team statistics

References

External links

Japan Football Association

1996 births
Living people
Association football people from Chiba Prefecture
Japanese women's footballers
Japan women's international footballers
Nadeshiko League players
Urawa Red Diamonds Ladies players
Albirex Niigata Ladies players
Women's association football goalkeepers
2019 FIFA Women's World Cup players
Footballers at the 2020 Summer Olympics
Olympic footballers of Japan